Namdun (also Romanized as Namdūn) is a village in Kenevist Rural District, in the Central District of Mashhad County, Razavi Khorasan Province, Iran. At the 2006 census, its population was 14, in 5 families.

References 

Populated places in Mashhad County